The American Way, also known as Riders of the Storm, is a 1986  American science fiction comedy film directed by Maurice Phillips and starring   Dennis Hopper and Michael J. Pollard.

Premise 
S&M TV is a pirate television station, broadcasting from a B-29 plane by a group of disgruntled Vietnam war veterans. After many years, the crew considers accepting an offer of amnesty, broadcasting legitimately, and going back to more normal lives. However, as the US Presidential campaign is starting, the captain of the plane decides S&M has a last job to do: to prevent the pro-war conservative candidate from winning the election.

Cast 
 Dennis Hopper  as The Captain 
 Michael J. Pollard as  Tesla
 Eugene Lipinski as  Ace
 James Aubrey  as  Claude
 Al Matthews  as Benedict
  William Armstrong as  Jerry
 Michael Ho as Minh
  Derek Hoxby as  Sam
  Nigel Pegram as Mme Westinghouse
  Mark Caven as Don
  Craig Pinder as  Irving
  Jeff Harding as  Doug
  Linda Lou Allen as  Mary
  Norman Chancer as Dr. King
 Gwen Humble  as Linda
 Ozzy Osbourne as Himself

Production
Parts of the film were shot at Glen Canyon in Utah.

References

External links 

1980s science fiction comedy films
American science fiction comedy films
Films shot in Utah
1986 directorial debut films
1986 films
1986 comedy films
1980s English-language films
1980s American films